The Minister for Disabilities (Italian: Ministro per le Disabilità) in Italy is one of the positions in the Italian government.

The current Minister for Disabilities is Alessandra Locatelli, who held the office since 22 October 2022.

List of Ministers
 Parties

 Governments

References

Disabilities